Wee Sneezawee is an album by American jazz saxophonist Jimmy Lyons recorded in 1983 for the Italian Black Saint label.

Reception

The AllMusic review awarded the album 4 stars. The New York City Jazz Record'''s reviewer wrote that "It's often dense and tense collectivized free jazz, but it's also radically egalitarian, each voice an equal even in the presence of Lyons' soaring virtuosity." The Penguin Guide to Jazz described the album as "the most conventional" of those recorded towards the end of Lyons's career.

Writing for Audiophile Audition, Doug Simpson commented: "Nothing Lyons recorded could be considered mainstream jazz, but over the 42 minutes, Lyons moves as close to a conventional nature as any Lyons record gets. Lyons is the leader, but there is a lot of room and space for the others. Malik shifts from unison lines with Lyons to impactful solo statements and is intense on the opening title track, matching Lyons' enlivened chords and lines. During the course of the program, Borca’s bassoon provides a deeper resonance which complements Parker’s bass, and often is the musical adhesive which grounds the five lengthy Lyons compositions."

Track listingAll compositions by Jimmy Lyons''
 "Wee Sneezawee" - 7:26 
 "Gossip" - 7:29 
 "Remembrance" - 6:56 
 "Shackinback" - 9:10 
 "Driads" - 11:44
Recorded at Vanguard Studios in New York City on September 26 & 27, 1983

Personnel
Jimmy Lyons - alto saxophone
Raphe Malik - trumpet
Karen Borca - bassoon
William Parker - bass
Paul Murphy - drums

References

Black Saint/Soul Note albums
Jimmy Lyons albums
1983 albums